Kleefeld (meaning clover-field in German) may refer to:

People

 Carolyn Mary Kleefeld, American poet and author
 Hans Kleefeld (1929–2016), Canadian designer
 Käte Stresemann (1883–1970), née Kleefeld, a German woman
 Kurt von Kleefeld (1881–1934), German lawyer

Places

 Kleefeld, Manitoba, a community in Manitoba, Canada
 Buchholz-Kleefeld, an administrative district of Hanover in Germany, served by Hannover-Kleefeld railway station
 Glebiska, German name Kleefeld, a village in Warmia-Masuria, Poland
 Sumiak, German name Kleefeld, a village in West Pomerania, Poland

See also
 Klee